Benjamin Noah Silverman (born August 15, 1970) is an American media executive.  He is the co-CEO and chairman of the entertainment production company Propagate.

From 2007–2009, Silverman served as co-chairman of NBC Entertainment and Universal Media Studios. He is also an Emmy and Golden Globe-winning executive producer of such shows as The Office, Jane The Virgin, Ugly Betty, Marco Polo, The Tudors and The Biggest Loser. Silverman also produced CW's praised No Tomorrow and Apple's first reality television show Planet of the Apps. On July 10, 2014, The Banff World Media Festival presented Silverman with the Award of Excellence in Digital Innovation. As of the fourth quarter 2016, Silverman's most recently released feature film Hands of Stone starring Edgar Ramirez, Robert De Niro and Usher, and was released theatrically in North America on August 26, 2016 through The Weinstein Company.

Life and career
Silverman was born in Pittsfield, Massachusetts. He was raised in a Reform Jewish family in Manhattan.   Silverman is a 1992 magna cum laude graduate of Tufts University, where he majored in history and belonged to the Epsilon Theta chapter of the Theta Chi fraternity.  His mother, Mary (Delson) Silverman, was an actress and programming executive whose career included employment at the Disney Channel, BBC, USA Network, Lifetime Television, and Court TV. His father, Stanley Silverman, is a music composer/arranger.

He had summer internships at Warner Bros., and after college in 1993, worked at CBS and then worked for Brandon Tartikoff at New World Entertainment. He worked for the William Morris Agency starting in 1995; Silverman was in charge of the international packaging division, where he was the company's youngest division head, packaging more than 25 television series, including Who Wants to Be a Millionaire, Weakest Link, Big Brother, and Queer as Folk.  He worked for William Morris Agency until 2002, when he left to found Reveille.

In 2007, Silverman received the P.T. Barnum Award from Tufts University for his exceptional work in the field of media and entertainment. Silverman is involved with multiple philanthropic endeavors, including Seeds of Peace, a group helping to foster peace among young people from adversarial cultures. In addition, Silverman sits on the Cedars-Sinai Hospital board of governors. Silverman also serves on the board of directors of Best Buddies, a non-profit organization dedicated to enhancing the lives of people with intellectual disabilities by providing guidance and integrated employment.

In 2008, Silverman received an Honorary Rose for lifetime achievement the Rose d'Or ceremony.

Silverman married Jennifer Cuoco, a real estate agent, in December 2010.

Reveille
Silverman is the founder of Reveille, a television, film, and theater production and distribution company now owned by Shine Limited under News Corporation. He founded Reveille in 2002 in order to exploit international formats by selling them in the United States. Through his work at Reveille, he is the executive producer of such shows as NBC's The Office, The Restaurant, The Biggest Loser, and ABC's Ugly Betty, as well as several cable shows, including Nashville Star, on USA Network, 30 Days on FX, MTV's Parental Control and Date My Mom, Blow Out on Bravo, and House of Boateng on the Sundance TV.

Journalist Michael Wolff wrote a 2001 profile of Silverman in New York Magazine a year before he founded Reveille. "In some sense, he's like those boy geniuses of the eighties and nineties who invented new financial instruments -- junk bonds and derivatives and whatnot. The discovery and marketing of a new format is really like that. It's creating something that is negotiable and transferable and that people believe in deeply -- it solves all their problems. Now, obviously, there is a certain obsolescence to these formats (with junk bonds you had inevitable bankruptcies). And Ben, of course, is already searching the world for new formats. Variety shows might be a possibility," Wolff wrote.

NBC

Silverman was named co-chairman of NBC Entertainment in 2007 (along with Marc Graboff), succeeding Kevin Reilly. That same year, Silverman was the first producer since Norman Lear, 34 years earlier, to have two shows nominated for an Emmy in the best comedy category (The Office and Ugly Betty). He is credited for his role in saving the critically acclaimed but low-rated NBC drama Friday Night Lights by striking an innovative deal with DirecTV. The satellite television provider agreed to take on a substantial amount of the show's production budget in exchange for exclusive first-window airing rights on its 101 channel. NBC would then repurpose the episodes to be aired on the network later in the season.

Electus
On July 27, 2009, Silverman announced he was leaving NBC to form a new company, Electus, in partnership with Barry Diller's IAC/InterActiveCorp, that would produce and distribute programs across media platforms, for television, the Web and mobile devices. As part of its inception, IAC partnered Electus with the interactive comedy portal CollegeHumor.  In January 2010, Silverman and Electus partnered with Jason Bateman and Will Arnett to launch their sponsor-driven advertising and digital production company DumbDumb. Electus also has partnerships with 5x5 and DiGa. On May 8, 2014, The CW announced a first season order for Silverman's new television show Jane The Virgin.

Acting roles
Silverman had a cameo appearance in the first episode of the fifth season of the television show Entourage. Silverman read a single line in which he expressed annoyance at Johnny Drama wasting his time.

Silverman appeared in four episodes during the ninth season of the television show The Office, starting with "Here Comes Treble"; he played Isaac, one of Jim's business partners.

Credits

References

External links
 
 
 "TV's Hot Property", Tufts e-news, July 02, 2003
 "Like Mother, Like Son - And Made for TV"
 "Meet Ben's Boring Successor"

1970 births
Living people
American reality television producers
American Reform Jews
Businesspeople from Massachusetts
NBC executives
People from Pittsfield, Massachusetts
People from Manhattan
Presidents of NBC Entertainment
Tufts University School of Arts and Sciences alumni
Television producers from New York City
American chief executives